General elections were held in Tanganyika in September 1958 and February 1959. Elections were held in five constituencies on 8 and 12 September 1958, and in the other five on 9 and 15 February 1959. The Tanganyika African National Union (TANU) and affiliated independents won all 30 elected seats in the Legislative Council.

Campaign
Fifteen of the 30 elected seats were uncontested, all of which were won by the TANU. In each constituency, voters voted for an African, Asian and European candidate. A further 34 members were appointed.

Results

By constituency

Aftermath
In December 1959, the United Kingdom agreed to the establishment of internal self-government, after fresh elections the following year.

References

1958
1958 in Tanganyika
1959 in Tanganyika
Tanganyika
Tanganyika
Tanganyika (territory)
Politics of Tanganyika